This is a list of mayors of Alice Springs Town Council. The mayor is an elected member of the council, who acts as a ceremonial figurehead at official functions, and carries the authority of council between meetings.

The current mayor is Matt Paterson.

List of Mayors of the Alice Springs Town Council  
(This list does not include deputy mayors in their acting capacity)

References

Lists of local government leaders of places in Australia
Alice Springs